Alexander Mikhailishin (born February 24, 1986 in Moscow, Soviet Union) spent most of his junior career skating in HC Spartak's hockey system. The young defenseman had a couple of stints with the Russian national team, but never earned a consistent spot on the squad.  The young prospect was largely drafted by the New Jersey Devils with the 155th selection in the 2004 NHL Entry Draft due to his immense size, but it appears that the defensive prospect has not justified the club's hopes, splitting his time between Russia's second and third tier leagues, never even cracking the Russian Super League since being drafted.

Career statistics

Regular season and playoffs

International

References

External links 
RussianProspects.com Alexander Mikhailishin Player Profile
 

1986 births
HC Spartak Moscow players
Living people
New Jersey Devils draft picks
Russian ice hockey defencemen